The Weper is a long, high ridge of hills up to  located in the district of Northeim in the German state of Lower Saxony.

Geography 
The Weper, which lies in South Lower Saxony and reaches a height of 379 m at the summit of the Balos, belongs to the southern part of the Leine Uplands. The ridge is located between the southeastern foothills of the Solling to the west and the rather distant valley of the Leine to the east. It runs in a north-south direction west of the town of Moringen, between Fredelsloh in the north and Hardegsen in the south. North of the Weper is the Ahlsburg ridge (up to 411.4 m), south is the small Gladeberg ridge (up to 360.2 m). To the west and south the Weper is bypassed by the upper reaches of a left-hand, western tributary of the Leine, the Espolde.

Description 
The Weper, much of which is covered by the eastern part of the Hardegsen State Forest, is heavily wooded in its narrow south, but largely open in the more extensive north. On the western slopes in the Weper Nature Reserve large areas are kept artificially open in order to preserve the dry chalk grasslands with their rare plant and animal species. Prior to the 19th century virtually the whole of the Weper was open before it was reforested. In the north there is a glider airfield on south-southeast of the Tönniesberg and not far west of Nienhagen. On the Balos is the Sohnrey Hut (Sohnreyhütte), named after Heinrich Sohnrey who once lived in Nienhagen, from where the entire surrounding countryside can be viewed.

Hills 
The hills and elevations of the Weper ridge include:

Rivers 
The rivers in and on the Weper ridge include (all in the catchment area of the Leine): 
 Bölle (rises on the southern edge of the Ahlsburg, passes the northeastern foothills of the Weper and is a western tributary of the Leine) 
 Dieße (rises on the eastern edge of the Solling, passes the northwestern foothills of the Weper and is a south-southwestern tributary of the Ilme) 
 Espolde (rises on the eastern edge of the Solling, passes the Weper to the west and south and is a western tributary of the Leine) 
 Moore (rises on the eastern slopes of the Weper and flows eastwards. It is a western tributary of the Leine) 
 Ummelbach (rises on the southeastern slopes of the Weper and flows eastwards. It is a northwestern tributary of the Espolde)

Towns and villages 
The towns, villages and hamlets around the Weper ridge are:(clockwise from the north)

External links 
 Regulations of the Brunswick regional government concerning the Weper Nature Reserve (pdf file; 983 kB)

Central Uplands
Forests and woodlands of Germany
Geography of Lower Saxony
Ridges of Lower Saxony
Natural regions of the Weser-Leine Uplands